The Douro is a major river of the Iberian Peninsula.

Douro may also refer to:

Places
 Douro DOC, a Portuguese wine region
 Douro Subregion, a Portuguese subregion
 Douro Province, a historical province of Portugal
 Douro is a community within the township of Douro-Dummer in Ontario, Canada

Other uses
 , British ship 1865–1882
 , a Portuguese destroyer in service from 1915 to 1931
 NRP Douro (1932), a Portuguese destroyer sold to Colombia before completion and renamed 
 , a Portuguese destroyer in service from 1936 to 1959

See also
 Alto Douro (disambiguation)
 Douro Litoral Province
 Duero, Bohol, a municipality in the Philippines